Tympanocryptis centralis, also known as central Australian earless dragon or central pebble dragon, is one of a documented species of a relatively small dragon belonging to the genus Tympanocryptis. 

This is a common species, with an apparently stable population.

Habitat 
This species utilizes a variety of desert habitats, but is most often found in association with stony ranges. Often takes shelter in spinifex, but can also be found in Eucalypt shrubland.

It is found in the Northern Territory, South Australia, and Western Australia.

Etymology 
Tympanocryptis: 'hidden ear'. 

Centralis: 'centralian', referring to the central distribution.

References

centralis
Agamid lizards of Australia
Reptiles described in 1925
Taxa named by Richard Sternfeld